Convoy ON-153 was the 153rd of the numbered series of ON convoys of merchant ships Outbound from the British Isles to North America. The World War II convoy departed Liverpool on 11 December 1942 and was met on 12 December by Mid-Ocean Escort Force Group B-7. Two merchant ships and the escort group leader were sunk in a North Atlantic battle with U-boat Wolf pack Raufbold before reaching the Western Ocean Meeting Point (WOMP) where the Western Local Escort Force assumed responsibility for the convoy on 23 December. Surviving ships reached New York City on 31 December.

Escorts
The convoy was protected by Escort Group B-7 comprising
2 Destroyers
Royal Navy – , 
4 Corvettes
Royal Navy - HMS Alisma, HMS Pink, HMS Snowflake, HMS Sunflower
1 Replenishment oiler
 British Lady
and by a Western Local Escort Force of
1 Destroyer
Royal Canadian Navy – HMCS Annapolis
3 Corvettes
Royal Canadian Navy - HMCS Buctouche, HMCS Edmundston, HMCS Timmins
1 Minesweeper
Royal Canadian Navy - HMCS Minas

U-boats
The convoy was attacked by 13 U-boats from Wolfpack Raufbold, namely

Ships in the convoy

References

Bibliography
 
 Tramp to Queen autobiography by Capt. John Treasure Jones, The History Press (2008)

External links
ON.153 at convoyweb

ON153
Naval battles of World War II involving Canada